Antonio Sagardía Ramos (Zaragoza, 5 January 1880 – Madrid, 16 January 1962) was a Spanish military officer and war criminal who fought for the Nationalist faction in the Spanish Civil War. He became known as the "Butcher of Pallars" (carnicero de Pallars) because of the massacre committed under his command in Pallars Sobirà.

Biography 
Sagardía Ramos was born in the Aragonese capital of Zaragoza, in a Basque–Navarre family. He joined the Spanish Army from a young age and in 1921 he rose to the rank of colonel.

Role in the Spanish Civil War 
Once the Spanish Civil War began following the Spanish coup of July 1936, Sagardía Ramos was called by one of the rebel leaders, General Emilio Mola, to rejoin the Army. He immediately commanded a unit of Falangist volunteers with whom he intervened in the Campaign of Gipuzkoa.

In August and September 1937, Sagardía Ramos took part in the War in the North and participated in the Battle of Santander, at the head of the so-called "Sagardía Column"; the unit exercised a harsh repression against the civilians and soldiers of the Republican faction, including numerous extrajudicial killings. In April 1938, Sagardía's troops were deployed in the Battle of the Segre, in which they hardly encountered any resistance. But in the face of casualties suffered by his column after a Republican attack, he said:

In May 1938, several extrajudicial killings took place that ravaged the Catalan comarca of Pallars Sobirà and resulted in 67 people shot, good part of them women, elderly and children. In January 1939, Sagardía Ramos participated in the Catalonia Offensive. A few weeks later he participated in the so-called "final offensive" of the war, and on 30 March he entered Alcalá de Henares at the head of his unit.

Post-war career 

After the Civil War ended, he was appointed Inspector General of the new Policía Armada, and as such he was part of the delegation that visited Nazi Germany in September 1940.

He subsequently served as military governor of Cartagena.

Bibliography 
  — (1940). Del Alto Ebro a las fuentes del Llobregat. Treinta y dos meses de guerra de la 62 División.

References 

1880 births
1962 deaths
Spanish people of Basque descent
People from Zaragoza
Spanish military personnel
Spanish military personnel of the Spanish Civil War (National faction)
Spanish generals
Spanish police officers
Spanish anti-communists